Sidney Jonas Budnick (June 18, 1921 – August 25, 1994) was an American abstract artist. He was born and raised in New York City.

Biography
While living in New York, Sidney Budnick met the Dutch artist Piet Mondrian. Budnick was greatly influenced by Mondrian's work and the De Stijl art movement. Budnick studied under Hans Hofmann, an abstract expressionist artist and teacher, and was friends with Harry Holtzman and Carl Holty, founders of the American Abstract Artists group.

Sidney Budnick was also encouraged by Hilla Rebay, the artistic advisor for Solomon R. Guggenheim. In 1939, Guggenheim and Rebay opened the Museum of Non-objective Painting, later named the Solomon R. Guggenheim Museum.  Some of Budnick's early work is classified with other works of the Museum of Non-objective Painting.

After serving in the army during World War II, Budnick earned his Bachelor of Arts degree at the IIT Institute of Design. While there, he studied under László Moholy-Nagy, the founding director of the New Bauhaus and head of the School of Design (renamed the Institute of Design in 1944).

In 1952 he completed his Master of Architecture at the Harvard Graduate School of Design studying under Walter Gropius, the founder of the Bauhaus school in Germany.

Budnick was an architect for the Department of Parks and Recreation for the State of California for many years. While earning his living as an architect to support his wife and three children, he continued to paint throughout his life until he died in 1994 in Oregon.

Budnick's work was included in an exhibition organized by Katherine Kuh at the Art Institute of Chicago in 1948, entitled "American Abstract and Surrealist Art."  His work is included in the collections of the Guggenheim Museum, Museum of Modern Art and the J. Donald Nichols collection.

References

Further reading
Wake Forest University, American Abstract Art of the 1930s and 1940s: The J. Donald Nichols Collection, 1998
Katherine Kuh, Abstract and Surrealist American Art. Prize Winners: The Fifty-Eighth Annual Exhibition of American Painting and Sculpture, Art Institute of Chicago, 1947

External links
 Ltunes
 Artnet
 Askart
 Carolina Arts

1921 births
1994 deaths
Painters from New York City
Harvard Graduate School of Design alumni
20th-century American painters
American male painters
20th-century American male artists